Joseph Lyons (1879–1939) was an Australian prime minister.

Joseph or Joe Lyons may also refer to:
Joseph Lyons (caterer) (1847–1917), co-founder of J. Lyons and Co.
Dennis Lyons or Joe Lyons (1916–2011), British scientist
Joseph M. Lyons (born 1951), Illinois state representative
Joe Lyons (rugby league) (born 1997), English rugby league player
Joe Lyons (footballer) (1914–1993), Australian rules footballer

See also
Lyons (surname)